The Tokyo Marathon is one of six World Marathon Majors and has been contested annually since 2007, except in 2020 when it was an elite-only race due to the COVID-19 pandemic and in 2021, when the marathon was postponed to 2022 due to the continuing effects of the COVID-19 pandemic. The Tokyo Marathon replaced two previous marathons in Tokyo, the Tokyo International Marathon which took place in even years from 1980 to 2006, and the Tokyo - New York Friendship International Marathon which took place in odd years. Ethiopia has been represented by the most Tokyo Marathon winners of any country, with 11 wins among nine distinct winners (four men and five women), while Kenya has been represented by the most winners in the men's race with seven wins among six distinct winners, in addition to two winners in the women's race. Japan has the most wins in the wheelchair race, with 12 wins among five distinct winners on the men's side and 10 wins among two distinct winners on the women's side.

Winners

Key: Course record (in bold)

Wheelchair race

Victories by nationality

Notes

References

External links
Past Tokyo Marathon results

 
Tokyo